West Tolgus is a village in the Tolgus Valley in west Cornwall, England, United Kingdom. It lies just off the A30 road south of Illogan, northeast of Camborne and northwest of Redruth.

Mining
The village was a notable mining area and was mined from the early 1720s.  Wheal Raven Mine produced over 700 tons of copper ore in the 1760s  and a little zinc ore, but hardly any tin. In fell into difficulty and had to close, facing stiff competition from other more successful mines in the area. Attempts were made in 1793 and in 1805 to reopen it and between 1810 and 1810 it reopened as Wheal Royal but was abandoned once again until the mining boom of 1824 when it reverted to its former name of Wheal Raven. It produced over 1500 tons of copper ore of a moderate grade in the period that followed but was closed and reopened  again between 1831 and 1836 in which it produced over 500 tons of copper ore.

In 1844, a new company purchased the mine and renamed it West Tolgus and Treloweth, and just West Tolgus from 1850. It closed in 1851 and again reopened in 1860 after being bought by John Taylor and Sons. Managed by Captain Joseph Jewell, they built an engine house with a 60-inch (later 65 then 70) pumping engine and a 10-foot stroke, enabling mining to reach a depth of 312 feet or 52 fathoms by April 1862. It employed over 120 people at the time and by 1879 over 230. During the 1870s a series of accidents caused the mine to flood, including flooding in 1873 when it closed by five months and flooding again in January 1879 when the balance bob broke in two places in Richards' Shaft. After the accidents and the fact the mine was not especially economically viable it ceased operations for the final time in February 1884.

References

Villages in Cornwall
Mines in Cornwall